The Kleinholz Stadion is an ice hockey stadium located in Olten, Switzerland. It is mainly used by EHC Olten, an ice hockey club that currently plays in the Swiss National League B. 
It was built in 1961 and renovated in 2014.

Olten
Indoor ice hockey venues in Switzerland
Buildings and structures in the canton of Solothurn